The Overlanders is a 1946 British-Australian Western film about drovers driving a large herd of cattle 1,600 miles overland from Wyndham, Western Australia through the Northern Territory outback of Australia to pastures north of Brisbane, Queensland during World War II.

The film was the first of several produced in Australia by Ealing Studios, and featured among the cast Chips Rafferty. It was an early example of the genre later dubbed the "meat pie western".

Plot
In 1942, the Japanese army is thrusting southwards and Australia fears invasion. Bill Parsons becomes concerned, and leaves his homestead in northern Australia along with his wife and two daughters, Mary and Helen. They join up with a cattle drive heading south led by Dan McAlpine. Others on the drive include the shonky Corky; British former sailor, Sinbad; Aboriginal stockmen, Nipper and Jackie.

The cattle drive is extremely difficult, encountering crocodiles, blazing heat and other dangers. Mary and Sinbad start a romance. Dan speaks out against Corky's plans to develop the Northern Territory.

Cast
Chips Rafferty as Dan McAlpine
John Nugent Hayward as Bill Parsons
Daphne Campbell as Mary Parsons
Jean Blue as Mrs Parsons
Helen Grieve as Helen Parsons
John Fernside as Corky
Peter Pagan as Sinbad
Frank Ransome as Charlie
Stan Tolhurst as Bert
Marshall Crosby as Minister
Clyde Combo as Jackie
Henry Murdoch as Nipper
Edmund Allison as two-up player
Jock Levy as two-up player
John Fegan as Police Sergeant

Development
The film came about because the Australian government was concerned that Australia's contribution to the war effort was not being sufficiently recognised. It contacted Britain's Ministry of Information, who in turn spoke with Michael Balcon at Ealing Studios, who was enthusiastic about the idea of making a film in Australia. He sent Harry Watt to Australia to find a subject. Watt travelled the country as an official war correspondent and guest of the Australian government. He spent eighteen months in Australia making the film.

Watt decided to exploit the Australian landscape by making a film set entirely outdoors. When visiting a government office in Canberra to advise on making documentaries, he heard about an incident in 1942 when 100,000 cattle were driven 2,000 miles in the Northern Territory to escape a feared Japanese invasion.

Watt was allowed to import only four technicians from Britain to assist – editor Inman Hunter, cinematographer Osmond Borradaile, production supervisor Jack Rix and camera operator Carl Kayser. The rest of the crew was drawn from Australia. The sound recording engineer was Beresford Charles Hallett

Watt spent 1944 travelling the route of the trek. Dora Birtles researched the subject in government files and archives. She later wrote a novelisation of the script, which was published.

Casting
There were nine lead roles and the casting process took two months. Watt ended up selecting four professional actors, an experienced amateur, and four newcomers to films. Chips Rafferty, whom Watt described as an "Australian Gary Cooper", was given his first lead role. Daphne Campbell was a nursing orderly who had grown up in the country but had never acted before. She was screen-tested after her picture was seen on the cover of a magazine, and selected over hundreds of applicants. Peter Pagan had worked in Sydney theatre and was serving in the army when selected by Watt.

Clyde Combo and Henry Murdoch were cast as the Aboriginal stockmen; they came from Palm Island because Harry Watt believed Northern Territory Aboriginal people did not speak English sufficiently well. New South Wales Aboriginal activist Bill Onus appeared in a minor role.

Chips Rafferty and John Nugent-Hayward were paid £25 a month for five months.

Production
Five hundred cattle were purchased by Ealing for use in the film. They were marked with the "overland" brand and later sold off for profit.

Shooting began in April 1945 at Sydney's North Head quarantine station, which stood in for the meat export centre at Wyndham in Western Australia. The unit was then flown by the RAAF to Alice Springs where they were based in an army camp.

A second unit headed by John Heyer spent several weeks filming movement of cattle from the air.

Three months later, the unit moved to the Roper River camp on the Elsey Station for another month, where the river crossing sequence was shot. This station was famous from the book We of the Never Never. In mid-September the unit returned to Sydney after five months of shooting.

During the making of the film, Campbell met and married her future husband.

The Australian government later declared they spent £4,359 to assist in the production of the film.

Post production work was done in Britain. The film score was written by the English composer John Ireland. It was his only film score. An orchestral suite was extracted from the score by the conductor Sir Charles Mackerras after Ireland's death.

Harry Watt claimed the original ending was more cynical, finishing with the unscrupulous 'Corky' being the only one who got a good job out of the trek, and a fade out on a roar of sardonic laughter from the rest of the overlanders. However he says he was advised to put a more upbeat ending.

Ealing were so pleased with Rafferty's performance they signed him to a long-term contract even before the film had been released.

Post-production
According to Leslie Norman, Harry Watt was not satisfied with the editing job done by Inman Hunter "so they asked me to take it over. I actually ripped it all apart and started over again. But I thought this could ruin Ted Hunter's career so I suggested they credit him as editor and I would take the title of supervising editor."

Reception
Neither Rafferty nor Campbell were able to make the film's Sydney premiere because Rafferty was making a film in the UK, and Campbell was looking after her one-week-old baby in Alice Springs. However local actor Ron Randell attended and was mobbed.

Critical
Reviews were extremely positive.

Years later Filmink magazine said "This is one of the best of the meat pie Westerns – it takes a very American concept, the cattle drive, and grounds it in the local culture. Sure, there's stampedes and romance, but no outlaws and shoot outs, and there's a feisty "squatter's daughter" character who is sensibly given a romance with Peter Pagan rather than Chips Rafferty."

Box office
The film was enormously successful at the box office in Australia and Britain; by February 1947 it was estimated 350,000 Australians had seen it, making it the most widely seen Australian film of all time.

According to trade papers, the film was a "notable box office attraction" at British cinemas in 1946. According to one report it was the 11th most popular film at the British box office in 1946 after The Wicked Lady, The Bells of St. Mary's, Piccadilly Incident, The Captive Heart, Road to Utopia, Caravan, Anchors Away, The Corn is Green, Gilda, and The House on 92nd Street'''. According to Kinematograph Weekly the 'biggest winner' at the box office in 1946 Britain was The Wicked Lady, with "runners up" being The Bells of St Marys, Piccadilly Incident, The Road to Utopia, Tomorrow is Forever, Brief Encounter, Wonder Man, Anchors Away, Kitty, The Captive Heart, The Corn is Green, Spanish Main, Leave Her to Heaven, Gilda, Caravan, Mildred Pierce, Blue Dahlia, Years Between, O.S.S., Spellbound, Courage of Lassie, My Reputation, London Town, Caesar and Cleopatra, Meet the Navy, Men of Two Worlds, Theirs is the Glory, The Overlanders, and Bedelia.

It was also the first Ealing picture to be widely seen in Europe.

US release
Some minor changes for censorship were made for the film's US release including the removal of the word "damn". The film was listed one of the 15 best films of the year by Bosley Crowther of the New York Times.

The movie was distributed in the US by a prestige department of Universal, a company created specifically to distribute British films from the Rank Organisation. The Overlanders was the second most popular of such movies, after Brief Encounter (1945).

Impact
This acclaim prompted Ealing (and its parent company, Rank, who distributed) to make a series of films in Australia out of Pagewood Film Studios. Among the first discussed projects was an adaptation of the James Aldridge novel, Signed with Their Honour.

By mid-1947, it appeared the company would make a co-production deal with Cinesound Productions but in August Sir Norman Rydge withdrew Cinesound. Ealing went ahead by themselves to make Eureka Stockade with Chips Rafferty.

Daphne Campbell received Hollywood enquiries and made a series of screen tests in Sydney but elected not to pursue a Hollywood career, staying with her husband and children in Alice Springs. Peter Pagan moved overseas and worked extensively in the US and London.

Home mediaThe Overlanders was released on DVD by Umbrella Entertainment in November 2012. The DVD is compatible with all region codes.

References

Further reading
 
 

External links

 
The Overlanders at Australian Screen Online
The Overlanders at BFI Screenonline
The Overlanders at Oz Movies
Review of film at Variety''

1946 films
1946 Western (genre) films
British Western (genre) films
British black-and-white films
Australian Western (genre) films
Australian films based on actual events
British films based on actual events
Australian World War II films
British World War II films
Ealing Studios films
Films directed by Harry Watt
Films produced by Michael Balcon
Films scored by John Ireland
1940s English-language films
1940s British films
1940s Australian films